The 2021 Mid-American Conference women's soccer tournament was the postseason women's soccer tournament for the Mid-American Conference held from October 31 through November 7, 2021. The First Round was held at campus sites. The semifinals and finals took place at Mickey Cochrane Stadium in Bowling Green, Ohio, home of the Bowling Green Falcons, the regular season conference champions. The six-team single-elimination tournament consisted of three rounds based on seeding from regular season conference play. The Bowling Green Falcons were the defending champions, and they successfully defended their title with a 3–0 win over Kent State in the final.  The title was the sixth for the Bowling Green women's soccer program and the fourth for head coach Matt Fannon. As tournament champions, Bowling Green earned the Mid-American's automatic berth into the 2021 NCAA Division I Women's Soccer Tournament.

Seeding 
Six Mid-American Conference schools participated in the tournament. Teams were seeded by conference record.  A tiebreaker was required to determine the second and third seeds in the tournament as Ohio and Kent State finished tied in the rankings with an identical 7–1–3 record.  The regular season match-up between the teams finished in a 0–0 tie on October 28, the final day of the regular season.  As a second tiebreaker, conference goal differential was used.  Ohio had the better goal differential and was awarded the second seed and first round bye.

Bracket

Source:

Schedule

First Round

Semifinals

Final

Statistics

Goalscorers

All-Tournament team

Source:

MVP in bold

References 

Mid-American Conference Women's Soccer Tournament
2021 Mid-American Conference women's soccer season